The western sand-swimming skink or western narrow-banded skink (Eremiascincus pallidus) is a species of skink found in Australia.

References

Eremiascincus
Reptiles described in 1875
Taxa named by Albert Günther